Anthoine is a given name and a surname, which is derived from the Antonius root name. Notable people with this name include the following:

Given name
Anthoine Hubert (1996–2019), French racing driver
Anthoine Lussier (born 1983), French ice hockey player

Surname
Annick Anthoine (born 1945), French rower
Emmanuelle Anthoine (born 1964), French politician
François Anthoine (1860–1944), French Army general
Henri Anthoine (1878 - unknown), French cyclist
Mo Anthoine, nickname for Julian Vincent Anthoine (1939–1989), British mountaineer

See also

Antoine

References